Vespa dybowskii, also known as the black hornet or Dybowski's hornet, is a species of hornet found in Japan, Korea, Russia and China. It is considered rare or uncommon throughout its range. It has been suggested for attention in the Red Database (vulnerable species) in Japan.

Description 
Vespa dybowskii is a small to medium-sized hornet, with workers generally 17 to 24 mm and queens measuring up to 30 mm. Its body is mainly black. Its head and the sides of the thorax are a reddish brown.

Distribution 
This species is generally found in temperate areas such as Japan, Russia and Korea, as well as China.

Behaviours 
Vespa dybowskii usually nests in above-ground cavities. The nest envelope is usually tubular-imbricate (envelope consisting of sections which run lengthwise).

One unique aspect in this species is that it is a social parasite of Vespa crabro and sometimes Vespa simillima. The queen of Vespa dybowskii takes over the nest of the initial species, and somehow induces the workers to raise her own brood.  Eggs of V. dybowskii may survive in foreign species nests partly due to being chemically transparent. Vespa dybowskii however, can establish the nest either by the independent foundation like as other hornets, but it can also raise young through the usurpation of the nests of Vespa crabro or Vespa simillima.

This species is said to be strongly defensive.

References 

Insects described in 1884
Vespidae
Hymenoptera of Asia